Nakhangal is a 2013 India Malayalam-language crime thriller film directed by Suresh Krishnan, written by R. Prem Nath, and produced by G. P. Vijayakumar. It stars Rakendu, Madan Mohan and Megha in lead roles. The film's songs were composed by M. G. Sreekumar and background score by M. R. Rajakrishnan.

Plot

'Nakhangal' tells the tale of three youngsters sharing a rented house. The house belongs to an NRI, whose friend Jeevan arranges for the rental. Giri, a driver in a courier company, Jackson, a tea estate accountant and Sherin, a nurse are the youngsters who stay together.

A fourth person enters the home and their lives when the rent is increased. He introduces himself as a writer with the pen name Manjila. But is fishy about Manjila who carries a gun with him. The plot thickens when he is found dead from drug overdose and Giri finds a bag of money in the room. There are takers for the money who wants it returned to them. But the three friends decide to keep it for themselves.

Meanwhile, Sherin is being persuaded by Vinodh, to accept his love for her. The money orchestrates the rest of the story with broken trust, gruesome murders and a suspense ending.

Cast
 Rakendu as Giri
 Madan Mohan as Jackson
 Megha 
 Arun Benny
 Santhosh Sleeba as Vinod Kumar
 Nandhu
 Augustine as a neighbour
 Vivek Gopan as Gunda 1
 Sumesh as Gunda 2
 Poojappura Ravi
 Solomon

Soundtrack

References

2010s Malayalam-language films
2013 films